Pam Alexander OBE (born April 1954) is a businesswoman and former senior civil servant specialising in housing and economic regeneration in England. She chairs a digital community engagement company, Commonplace, and is a non-executive Director of the London Legacy Development Corporation (LLDC) and of the Connected Places Catapult. Until recently she was chair of the Covent Garden Market Authority, a Trustee of the Design Council and Chair of Design Council CABE. She was Chief Executive of the South East England Development Agency (SEEDA) from 2004–2011, and of the Historic Buildings and Monuments Commission for England (English Heritage) from 1997 to 2001. She was made OBE in 2012 for her services to urban regeneration in the South East.

Early life 
Alexander was born in April 1954. She attended The Lady Eleanor Holles School, Hampton, Middlesex between 1960 and 1971. She took an MA in Geography at the University of Cambridge, Newnham College between 1972 and 1975. She was subsequently President of the Newnham Roll Committee (the alumnae group) from 2015 to 2018 and is currently an Honorary Associate.

Career 

Alexander started her career as a civil servant in the Department of the Environment (now part of DEFRA) as an Administration Trainee. Over the course of 20 years from 1975-1995 she rose to become a senior civil servant. During the period she was involved in the development of policies for housing, social housing, regeneration, local government finance, and transport, and was involved in the sale of 10 water companies. She joined the Housing Corporation in 1995 as a Deputy Chief Executive. She left two years later in 1997 when two deputy CEO positions were merged into one, and was appointed as CEO of English Heritage some months later. Whilst there she led a significant restructuring, working with the then chairman Jocelyn Stevens, but left four years later when the incoming chairman Neil Cossons felt that a further restructuring was needed. She spent the next two years as a consultant to the Cabinet Office reviewing the effectiveness of executive agencies. She was then appointed Chief Executive of the South East England Development Agency (SEEDA) in 2003 by the then chair, James Braithwaite, where she was one of the highest paid female quango chiefs in the UK, and was listed in the Telegraph top 100 British business people in the public sector. During this period she also served four years as co-chair of the UK Government Women's Enterprise Task Force (created by Gordon Brown in December 2006), with Glenda Stone.

She left SEEDA in 2011 after nearly 8 years at the helm and has subsequently focussed on a wide range of non-executive positions. Prominent among these are her two terms as chair of the Covent Garden Market Authority, presiding over the redevelopment of the New Covent Garden Market at Nine Elms. She oversaw the opening of a new Flower Market, the Food Exchange, and the start of construction of the new Fruit and Veg Market. She was also Chair of Design Council CABE from 2014 to 2018 and Deputy Chair of the overall Design Council during 2018. She was until recently a non-executive Director of Crossrail Ltd. and Crest Nicholson Plc. She is currently chair of Commonplace Digital Ltd, and a non-executive director of the Connected Places Catapult.

Personal life 

Alexander is married, with four stepchildren, seven grandchildren and two nieces. She lives in Wandsworth, London. Her interests include choral singing, tennis, and walking.

References

External links
Pam Alexander Linkedin Profile

1954 births
Living people